Family Food Fight (abbreviated as FFF) is an American cooking reality competition television series based on the Australian television series of the same name. The series is produced by Endemol Shine North America and Yardie Girl Productions, with Faye Stapleton, Ayesha Curry, Michael O'Sullivan, Shab Azma, Robert Flutie, Sharon Levy, DJ Nurre, and Georgie Hurford-Jones serving as executive producers. It premiered on ABC on June 20, 2019, and consisted of 8 episodes.

Contestants

Elimination chart

Episodes

Production

Development
In June 2018, ABC acquired the rights to the Australian cooking reality competition television series Family Food Fight and ordered 8 episodes. Cookbook author and food personality Ayesha Curry serves as both host and one of the judges, and executive produces alongside Robert Flutie, Shab Azma, DJ Nurre, Georgie Hurford-Jones, Faye Stapleton and Michael O'Sullivan. The series is produced by Endemol Shine North America and Yardie Girl Productions. It features eight American families facing off in high-pressure cooking challenges inspired by real home cooking and family food traditions to determine which is the country's top food family and win a grand prize of $100,000. Open casting calls were held in July in Los Angeles, California, and in August in Chicago, Illinois and New York, New York. Online video submissions were also accepted. In October 2018, Cat Cora and Graham Elliot were announced as judges alongside Curry.

Filming
Production began at the end of October in Los Angeles.

References

External links
 
 

2010s American cooking television series
2010s American reality television series
2019 American television series debuts
American Broadcasting Company original programming
American television series based on Australian television series
Cooking competitions in the United States
English-language television shows
Television series by Endemol
2019 American television series endings
Television shows filmed in Los Angeles